Mica Creek Power Station is located 5 km south of Mount Isa in north-west Queensland, Australia. It was natural gas powered with 12 turbines of various sizes that generate a combined capacity of 318 MW of electricity. The power station is owned by state government owned Stanwell Corporation.

Mica Creek was originally coal-fired, with conversion to natural gas completed in 2000. Gas is sourced from the Cooper Eromanga Basin gas field via the 840 km Carpenteria Pipeline.

Mica Creek supplied electricity to mining companies in the region, as well as Mount Isa, Cloncurry, and the nearby region.

Current Status
For more than 54 years, Mica Creek was the sole large-scale supplier of electricity to mining and residential communities in the State's north west.

In December 2014, a new power station was officially opened in Mount Isa. Customers of Mica Creek switched to the new power station when their power purchase agreements expired, with the exception of one mining customer. They will continue to receive power from Mica Creek until 2019.

At the end of 2014, the requirement for generation from Mica Creek was reduced to less than 100 MW, in line with the commissioning of Diamantina Power Station.

In December 2014, work began to put Mica Creek into a long-term configuration. The C1 and C2 units were placed in cold storage, leaving the power station with seven operational generating units.

The Mica Creek Power Station will be shut down at 8am on 1 January 2021 as the last of its contracts are completed. The Diamantina Power Station will ramp up as Mica Creek's load is gradually lowered.

See also

List of active power stations in Queensland

References

Natural gas-fired power stations in Queensland
North West Queensland
Buildings and structures in Mount Isa